Nimantran is a 1971 Bengali film directed by Tarun Majumdar, based on a story by Bibhutibhushan Bandyopadhyay, and starring Sandhya Roy and Anup Kumar in the lead roles. At the 19th National Film Awards, it won the National Film Award for Best Feature Film in Bengali.

Synopsis 
The film tells the story of two people who fall in love with each other, are separated, and meet again many years later. Hirendranath or Hiru (Anup Kumar), a young man from Calcutta, goes to visit his aunt in her village. There he meets Kumudini or Kumu (Sandhya Roy), a simple girl who has lost her father and lives with her uncle. Gradually, Hiru and Kumu get close, but marriage is denied by Kumu's uncle. Hiru returns to the city with a heavy heart, and gets a job in the railways in Jamalpur. There the boiler inspector becomes very fond of him. After an accident, the boiler inspector, on his deathbed, requests Hiru to marry his daughter Surama. They get married. However, Surama is ambitious and not satisfied with their financial and social status. Subsequently, Hiru quits his job, starts a business and becomes a successful man. However, he cannot give time and attention to his wife. Despite of being a financially rich couple, both Hiru and Surama feels alone. 

One day, Hiru's aunt writes to him many years after his first visit. He goes to the village and discovers that Kumu is now married, but that her husband does not care for her. Old feelings are rekindled in both of them. However, they cannot go against social customs.

Cast 
 Sandhya Roy as Kumi/Kumudini
 Anup Kumar as Hiru/Hirendranath Ganguly
 Nandini Maliya as Suro
 Kali Bannerjee as Dayal Dutta/village postmaster
 Pahari Sanyal as Suro's father
 Jahar Roy as village doctor
 Sandhya Rani as Kumudini's mother
 Ajit Banerjee as Hiru's uncle
  Aparna Debi as Hiru's mother
 Gyanesh Mukherjee as the boatman
 Arun Mukherjee as the doctor(Hiru's friend)
 Haridhan Mukherjee as ghatak

Crew 
 Direction -- Tarun Majumdar
 Music-- Hemanta Mukherjee
 Cinematography -- Shakti Banerjee 
 Editing -- Dulal Dutta

Music 
All songs composed by Hemanta Mukherjee (except Dure Kothay, a Rabindra Sangeet). The songs are:

1. Amar Dukhe Dukhe (sung by Nirmalendu Chowdhury, Banashree Sengupta) 

2. Ami Bondhur Premagune Pora (sung by Nirmalendu Chowdhury) 

3. Chyang Dhore Byang (sung by Anup Ghoshal, Geeta Chowdhury and chorus) 

4. Dure Kothay (sung by Kanika Banerjee) 

5. Peeriti Boliya Ekti Kamal (sung by Hemanta Mukherjee and chorus) 

6. Tara Ma Mago Tara, Singhaprishthe Bhar Koriye (sung by Hemanta Mukherjee)

Reception 
When released, the film received both commercial and critical success. It not only won the National Film Award for Best Feature Film in Bengali, but also won a number of BFJA Awards, including Best Indian Films (along with others). It continues to be popular, as shown by its availability in DVD form in multiple distributions.  The songs of the film, sung by Hemanta Mukherjee (who won a National Award for Nimantran), Kanika Bandyopadhyay and others, remain popular.

Preservation 
Nimantran has been restored and digitised by the National Film Archives of India.

Awards 
 National Film Award for Best Feature Film in Bengali
 National Film Awards; Best Playback Singer (Male) -- Hemanta Mukherjee
 BFJA Awards 1972:
 Best Actress - Sandhya Roy
 Best Cinematography (Black And White) - Shakti Banerjee
 Best Director - Tarun Majumdar
 Best Indian Films

References

External links 
 

1971 films
Bengali-language Indian films
Best Bengali Feature Film National Film Award winners
 Indian black-and-white films
1970s Bengali-language films
Films based on works by Bibhutibhushan Bandyopadhyay